"Funeral for Yesterday" is the first single and title track from Kittie's album of the same name.

The single peaked at #40 on Billboard'''s Mainstream Rock Songs chart shortly after its release. It was featured in the video game Project Gotham Racing 4''.

Track listing

Charts

Personnel
 Morgan Lander – lead vocals, guitar
 Tara McLeod – guitar
 Trish Doan – bass
 Mercedes Lander – drums, backing vocals

References

External links
 Official Music Video at YouTube

2007 songs
2007 singles
Kittie songs